Bob and Mike Bryan were the defending champions, and retained their title defeating Alexander Peya and Bruno Soares in the final, 6–4, 6–3.

Seeds

Draw

Finals

Top half

Bottom half

References
General

Specific

BNP Paribas Open - Men's Doubles
2014 BNP Paribas Open